Bheegi Palkein is a 1982 Indian Bollywood romance drama film directed by Sisir Mishra and produced by K. K. Arya. It stars Raj Babbar and Smita Patil in pivotal roles.

Plot
It was based on the story of an Odisha Brahmin family, and dealt with the caste system and marital differences.

The film starts with Ishwar Acharya (Raj Babbar), an I.A.S. officer who goes for an inspection of a Roman Catholic Mission school of Odisha. There, he meets Shanti, his estranged wife, (Smita Patil) who works as a teacher. Why are they separated?

Ishwar (Raj Babbar) and Shanti (Smita Patil) are childhood friends. They live, study and travel together and fall in love with each other as adults. When Ishwar's sister-in-law (Sulabha Deshpande) chooses a bride for him, he refuses and announces that he wants to marry Shanti. His entire family except his brother is opposed to this - because Shanti belongs to a lower class and comes from a poor family. Ishwar gets a job in a private company and goes in for a registered marriage with Shanti after which they live separate from the joint family. 

Marital differences soon crop up due to Ishwar's short temper and tendency to discount Shanti's opinion. After the birth of their son, Shanti starts working in a bank. But Ishwar doesn't like this. One day, Ishwar has a bike accident and blames Shanti for it. Shanti is more understanding and doesn't argue with him. During the same time, their son contracts fever and dies. When Ishwar learns of this he blames her, stops trusting her and returns to the joint family. Shanti also leaves the house after this and joins the  Roman Catholic Mission school. Realising his mistake, Ishwar wants to apologize to her, but is not been able to locate her.

Flashback over. Ishwar goes to her cottage and wants her to go back with him. Shanti tells him that he shouldn't make a decision as her husband.  Ishwar agrees that the husband has been defeated, and begs that they stay friends.

Cast
 Raj Babbar as Ishwar Acharya
 Smita Patil as Shanti Acharya
 Dina Pathak as Mrs. Acharya
 Sulabha Deshpande as Janki Acharya
 Suresh Chatwal as Prakash Acharya
 Laxmi Chhaya as Ishwar's Sister
 Jagdeep as Hussain Bhai
 Asit Sen as Divisional Manager
 Leela Mishra as Chachi
 Umakant Mishra as Father at Church

Music
The soundtrack was composed by Jugal Kishore–Tilak Raj and written by M. G. Hashmat and was very popular upon release. The song "O Mother Mary" earned special attention and popularity. The song "Janam Janam Ka Saath Hai" was also one of the most popular song of the year.

Filming
The film locations included Jagannath Temple, Puri, Cuttack Chandi Temple (Cuttack), Udayagiri and Khandagiri Caves. The first song of this film was shot in Roman Catholic Church (Surada). Other scenes were shot in Cuttack, Bhubaneswar and Brahmapur. Basically the overall film was shot in Odisha and some studios in Mumbai.

Crew
Director: Sisir Mishra
Producer: K. K. Arya
Music Director: Jugal Kishore, Tilak Raj
Lyrics: M. G. Hashmat
Playback Singers: Amit Kumar, Asha Bhosle, Kishore Kumar, Lata Mangeshkar, Mohammad Rafi, Sangita Mahapatra
Make up (sequence shot at Odisha): Samaresh Pal

References

External links

1980s Hindi-language films
1982 films
Films set in Odisha
Films shot in Odisha
Indian romantic drama films
Films scored by Jugal Kishore–Tilak Raj